Rarahu is a genus of jumping spiders endemic to Samoa. , it contains only one species, Rarahu nitida. Berland probably adapted the genus name Rarahu from Pierre Loti's book of the same name, which was published in 1880. Loti himself either used the rare Tahitian word "rarahu", meaning (amongst other things) "to eat tapu things", or changed the name of the volcano "Raraku". The species name is from Latin nitida "shining", "handsome", or "neat" (a false cognate).

Footnotes

References
  (1946): The Origin of Pierre Loti's Name "Rarahu". Modern Language Notes 61(4): 288.
  (2007): The world spider catalog, version 8.0. American Museum of Natural History.

External links
 Diagnostic drawings

Salticidae
Endemic fauna of Samoa
Monotypic Salticidae genera
Spiders of Oceania